Lise Birgitte Vaksdal Fredriksen (born 24 October 1979) is a Norwegian sailor.

She was born in Bærum, and has represented Asker Seilforening and KNS. She competed at the 2004 and 2008 Summer Olympics. In 2008, she placed ninth in the Yngling class, together with Siren Sundby and Alexandra Koefoed.

References

External links
 

1979 births
Living people
Sportspeople from Bærum
Norwegian female sailors (sport)
Sailors at the 2004 Summer Olympics – Yngling
Sailors at the 2008 Summer Olympics – Yngling
Olympic sailors of Norway